Progress M-63, identified by NASA as Progress 28P, was a Progress spacecraft used to resupply the International Space Station. It was a Progress-M 11F615A55 spacecraft, with the serial number 363.

Launch
Progress M-63 was launched by a Soyuz-U carrier rocket from Site 1/5 at the Baikonur Cosmodrome. Launch occurred at 13:02 UTC on 5 February 2008.

Docking
The spacecraft docked with the Pirs module at 14:38 UTC on 7 February 2008. Pirs had been vacated by the departure of Progress M-62 which had undocked on 4 February 2008. Progress M-63 successfully docked using the automated Kurs system; cosmonaut Yuri Malenchenko was standing by to guide it in using the backup manual TORU system should it have been necessary. Progress M-63 remained docked for 60 days before undocking at 08:49 UTC on 7 April 2008. It was deorbited at 11:50 UTC on 7 April 2008. The spacecraft burned up in the atmosphere over the Pacific Ocean, with any remaining debris landing in the ocean at around 12:36 UTC.

Progress M-63 carried supplies to the International Space Station, including food, water and oxygen for the crew and equipment for conducting scientific research.

See also

 List of Progress flights
 Uncrewed spaceflights to the International Space Station

References

 Progress M-63

Spacecraft launched in 2008
Progress (spacecraft) missions
Spacecraft which reentered in 2008
Supply vehicles for the International Space Station
Spacecraft launched by Soyuz-U rockets